2014 Women's Volleyball Thai-Denmark Super League was the second edition of the tournament. It was held at the MCC Hall of The Mall Bangkapi in Bangkok, Thailand from 8 – 12 May 2014.

Teams
 Ayutthaya A.T.C.C.
 Idea Khonkaen
 Nakhonnon
 Nakhon Ratchasima
 Sisaket
 Supreme Chonburi

Pools composition

Preliminary round

Pool A

|}

|}

Pool B

|}

|}

Final round

Semifinals

|}

3rd place

|}

Final

|}

Final standing

See also 
 2014 Men's Volleyball Thai-Denmark Super League

References
 

Women's,2014
Thai-Denmark Super League
Volleyball,Thai-Denmark Super League